Woken is an upcoming sci-fi dystopian thriller starring Erin Kellyman and Maxine Peake. It is written and directed by Alan Friel in his feature length directorial debut.

Synopsis
Anna is being nursed to health by Helen and Peter on a remote island  in the North Sea after waking up with no memory, pregnant, and in the middle of a worldwide pandemic.

Cast

Erin Kellyman as Anna 
Maxine Peake as Helen 
Ivanno Jeremiah as James
Corrado Invernizzi as Peter
Peter McDonald as Doctor Henry
Oscar Coleman as Joshua

Production
Friel and Peake previously worked together on his short film Cake. The film is produced by Fantastic Films and Propaganda Italia. Screen Ireland awarded €700,000 funding to the project. Filming took place in April 2022 on Fanore Beach in County Clare. Bankside Films are handling international sales for the project. Filming wrapped in June 2022 after 5 weeks, filming also took place at the University of Limerick. The film has support from the Italian Ministry of Culture. Prosthetics and SFX make-up are overseen by Chiara Bartoli, visual effects by Giuseppe Squillaci, with post-production being handled in Italy. Robbie Ryan is handling the photography and Tony Kearns the editing. The film’s production is by Stephen Kelliher on behalf of Bankside Films, and Brendan McCarthy, John McDonnell and Deirdre Levins for Fantastic Films, and by Marina Marzotto and Mattia Oddone for Propaganda Italia. Stephen Kelliher and Sophie Green are Executive Producers for Bankside Films. Phil Hunt and Compton Ross are acting as Executive Producers for Head Gear Films with Niamh Fagan as Executive Producer for Screen Ireland.

Release
The film is in post-production but may premiere in Ireland in late-2022.

References

External links
 

2020s dystopian films
2020s horror drama films
2020s psychological drama films
2020s psychological horror films
2020s science fiction drama films
2020s science fiction horror films
2020s science fiction thriller films
Irish horror thriller films
Irish post-apocalyptic films
Irish science fiction drama films
Irish science fiction horror films
Irish science fiction thriller films
Irish thriller drama films
Films shot in Ireland
2020s English-language films
RTÉ films
Upcoming films
Upcoming directorial debut films